The Rørvikvatnet Nature Reserve is located on the southeast part of Vigra island in the municipality of Giske in Møre og Romsdal county, Norway.

The area received protection in 1988 "to preserve an important wetland area with its appertaining plant communities, bird life, and other wildlife," according to the conservation regulations. The reserve consists of a small shallow pond surrounded by marsh and cultivated land. It is a nesting area for wetland birds and is also an area that birds pass through during migration. Two bird species that nest here are of international importance, six species are of national importance, and 11 species (of which eight nest here) are of regional importance. The landscape is partially covered by rich vegetation where there is shell sand, and there is a wind-blown sand area that is relatively unique to the region. The nature reserve lies a little bit south of Ålesund Airport. Traffic is not permitted in the area from April to August.

The nature reserve is one of six natural areas that were included in the Giske Wetlands System Ramsar site, which was established in 1996.

References

External links
 Mijlø-direktoratet: Rørvikvatnet. Map and description of the nature reserve.
 Miljøverndepartementet. 1987. Rørvikvatnet naturreservat, Giske kommune, Møre og Romsdal fylke. 1:5,000 map of the nature reserve.
 Forskrift om vern av Rørvikvatnet naturreservat, Giske kommune, Møre og Romsdal. 1988.

Nature reserves in Norway
Ramsar sites in Norway
Protected areas of Møre og Romsdal
Giske
Protected areas established in 1988
1988 establishments in Norway